Yaroslav Zaiats is a Soviet and Ukrainian former professional footballer played as a defender.

Career
He began playing at Nyva Vinnytsia from 1980 until 1990, where he played 330 and scored 20 goals. In 1990 he moved to Błękitni Kielce in Poland. Here he stayed until 1994 where he played 94 matches and scored two goals. In 1994 he returned to Ukraine on the football club of Bukovyna Chernivtsi until 1997, where he played 65 matches and scored two goals also with the club got second place in Ukrainian First League in 1995–96. In 1997 he moved to Desna Chernihiv, where he played 66 matches and scored one goal, where he contributed to win the Ukrainian Second League in the season 1996–97.

Honours
Desna Chernihiv
 Ukrainian Second League: 1996–97

References

External links 
 Yaroslav Zaiats allplayers.in.ua

1960 births
Living people
Soviet footballers
Soviet expatriate footballers
Ukrainian footballers
Association football defenders
FC Desna Chernihiv players
FC Bukovyna Chernivtsi players
FC Nyva Vinnytsia players
Błękitni Kielce players
Ukrainian First League players
Ukrainian Premier League players
Soviet expatriate sportspeople in Poland
Ukrainian expatriate sportspeople in Poland
Expatriate footballers in Poland
Ukrainian expatriate footballers